The Killer World Tour was a concert tour by the heavy metal band Iron Maiden from 17 February 1981 to 15 November 1981. This would be the band's first world tour, including their debut shows in North America (where they supported Judas Priest on their World Wide Blitz Tour and UFO on select dates) and Japan where they recorded the live release, Maiden Japan. On top of this, the band moved into larger venues in the United Kingdom, including the Hammersmith Odeon, London.

This would be Iron Maiden's last tour with singer Paul Di'Anno, who was dismissed due to his unreliability. He was replaced with Samson vocalist Bruce Dickinson, with whom the band undertook a short series of concerts in Italy and the UK before they set about writing and recording their next album, The Number of the Beast.

Setlist
 (Intro) "The Ides of March" (from Killers, 1981)
 "Wrathchild" (from Killers, 1981)
 "Purgatory" (from Killers, 1981)
 "Sanctuary" (from Iron Maiden, 1980)
 "Remember Tomorrow" (from Iron Maiden, 1980)
 "Another Life" (from Killers, 1981)
 "Genghis Khan" (from Killers, 1981)
 "Killers" (from Killers, 1981)
 "Innocent Exile" (from Killers, 1981)
 "Murders in the Rue Morgue" (from Killers, 1981)
 "Twilight Zone" (from Killers, 1981)
 "Phantom of the Opera" (from Iron Maiden, 1980)
 "Iron Maiden" (from Iron Maiden, 1980)
 "Running Free" (from Iron Maiden, 1980)
 "Transylvania" (from Iron Maiden, 1980)
 Guitar solo
 "Drifter" (from Killers, 1981)
 "Prowler" (from Iron Maiden, 1980)
Notes:
 "Strange World" (from Iron Maiden, 1980) was performed on 23 May 1981 and 24 May 1981.
 "I've Got the Fire" (Montrose cover) was performed on 24 May, 26 October, 27 October, and 15 November 1981.
 "22 Acacia Avenue" and "Children of the Damned" were played at the 15 November Rainbow show as a preview for The Number of the Beast album.  The intro solo on "Children of the Damned" is different from the final studio version.
 "The Prisoner" and "Run to the Hills" were played at the "secret" show at the Ruskin Arms on 23 December. "The Prisoner" had slightly different lyrics in the second verse and final chorus.

Tour dates

Reference

Festivals and other miscellaneous performances
Iron Maiden performed a matinée and an evening concert
This show was in support of Judas Priest
This concert was a part of Summerfest
This show was in support of UFO

Cancelled and rescheduled dates
The tour was subject to a number of cancellations due to problems with Paul Di'Anno's voice, causing four German dates to be cancelled and several Scandinavian dates to be rescheduled. According to band manager Rod Smallwood, the reason for the vocal issues were brought about by adopting a "rock star" lifestyle, which Di'Anno states was because he "couldn't see [his] way to the end of" the band's heavy schedule and that he believed that this was "what you were supposed to do in a big, successful rock band." On the other hand, Steve Harris, the band's bassist, has since said that he did not "know whether he was seeking attention or what", arguing that having to cancel shows because of personal problems was intolerable and ultimately cemented Di'Anno's dismissal. The full list of cancelled dates are as follows:

 27 April 1981: Winschoten, Netherlands, De Klinker (Poor ticket sales.)
 30 April 1981: Offenbach am Main, West Germany, Stadthalle Offenbach
 1 May 1981: Hamburg, West Germany
 2 May 1981: Dortmund, West Germany
 3 May 1981: West Berlin, Neue Welt
 7 May 1981: Lund, Sweden, Olympen; (Rescheduled to 9 September.)
 8 May 1981: Stockholm, Sweden, Göta Lejon; (Rescheduled to 8 September.)
 9 May 1981: Oslo, Norway
 10 May 1981: Copenhagen, Denmark, Odd Fellows Mansion; (Rescheduled to 10 September.)

References

Citations

Sources

External links
 Official website
 Killer World Tour Dates

Iron Maiden concert tours
1981 concert tours